George Franklin Brumm (January 24, 1878May 29, 1934) was a Republican member of the U.S. House of Representatives from Pennsylvania.

George F. Brumm was born in 1878 in Minersville, Pennsylvania.  His father was Congressman Charles N. Brumm.  He graduated from the University of Pennsylvania in Philadelphia, Pennsylvania, in 1901, and from the University of Pennsylvania Law School in 1907.  He served in a Pennsylvania National Guard engineer unit on the Mexican border in 1916.  He was the election commissioner for Texas in 1918 to take the vote of servicemen at cantonments, and an attorney for the conscription board during World War I.  He was an unsuccessful Republican candidate for the nomination to Congress in 1918 and 1920.

Brumm was elected as a Republican to the Sixty-eighth and to the succeeding Congress.  He served as chairman of the United States House Committee on Expenditures in the Department of the Navy during the Sixty-ninth Congress.  He was an unsuccessful candidate for renomination in 1926.  He was again elected to the Seventy-first and to the two succeeding Congresses.  He died in office in Philadelphia, Pennsylvania, and was buried in Charles Baber Cemetery in Pottsville, Pennsylvania.

See also
 List of United States Congress members who died in office (1900–49)

Sources

The Political Graveyard

Brumm, George Franklin
1878 births
1934 deaths
Burials at Charles Baber Cemetery
University of Pennsylvania Law School alumni
Republican Party members of the United States House of Representatives from Pennsylvania